Swap Shop is an Australian children's television series which screened on the ABC in 1988.

Characters
 Melissa Jaffer as Aunt Mimi
 Tim McKenzie as George
 Anthony Brandon Wong

Episodes
 Moo
 Fire
 Air
 Tents
 Novel
 Flyers

International
The series also screened in the UK and Canada.

See also
List of Australian television series

References

External links
Swap Shop at Australian Television Information Archive
Swap Shop at Screen Australia

1988 Australian television series debuts
1989 Australian television series endings
Television shows set in Australia
Australian Broadcasting Corporation original programming
Australian children's television series